Ian McInnes (born 22 March 1967) is a Scottish former footballer. He played as a right winger for Rotherham United and Lincoln City in the Football League before representing Kilmarnock, Stranraer, Stirling Albion and Albion Rovers in the Scottish Football League.

References

External links

Lincoln City F.C. Official Archive Profile
Unofficial Ian McInnes Profile at The Forgotten Imp

1967 births
Living people
Scottish footballers
Association football wingers
Rotherham United F.C. players
Lincoln City F.C. players
Kilmarnock F.C. players
Stranraer F.C. players
Stirling Albion F.C. players
Albion Rovers F.C. players
English Football League players
Scottish Football League players
Cumnock Juniors F.C. players
East Kilbride Thistle F.C. players
Footballers from Hamilton, South Lanarkshire
Scottish Junior Football Association players